Stevens Creek can refer to:

In Canada:
 Stevens Creek (Ontario), a tributary of the Rideau River

In the United States:
 Stevens Creek (California), a tributary of San Francisco Bay
 Stevens Creek (Illinois), a tributary of the Sangamon River
 Stevens Creek, Virginia, a community in Grayson County

See also
 Stephens Creek (disambiguation)